Progress M-50, identified by NASA as Progress 15P, was a Progress spacecraft used to resupply the International Space Station. It was a Progress-M 11F615A55 spacecraft, with the serial number 350.

Launch & Docking
Progress M-50 was launched by a Soyuz-U carrier rocket from Site 1/5 at the Baikonur Cosmodrome. Launch occurred at 05:03:07 UTC on 11 August 2004. The spacecraft docked with the aft port of the Zvezda module at 05:01:08 UTC on 14 August 2004.

It remained docked for 131 days before undocking at 19:37:02 UTC on 22 December 2004. to make way for Progress M-51. It was deorbited at 22:32:06 UTC on 22 December 2004. The spacecraft burned up in the atmosphere over the Pacific Ocean, with any remaining debris landing in the ocean at around 23:23:38 UTC.

Progress M-50 carried supplies to the International Space Station, including food, water and oxygen for the crew and equipment for conducting scientific research.

See also

 List of Progress flights
 Uncrewed spaceflights to the International Space Station

References

Spacecraft launched in 2004
Progress (spacecraft) missions
Spacecraft which reentered in 2004
Supply vehicles for the International Space Station
Spacecraft launched by Soyuz-U rockets